Derk Sauer is a Dutch media magnate and the founder of The Moscow Times.

Biography 
Sauer, a native of Amsterdam, has considered himself a Maoist in the past, having participated in Dutch left wing politics since his youth. He claims that the 'Red May' student protests of Paris in 1968, which happened while he was 15 years old, informed much of his political beliefs. He later rejected communist ideology and has described Mao as a "monster". He is a member of the Socialist Party of the Netherlands

Despite not speaking Russian, Sauer was approached by Russian journalists in 1989 while serving as an editor for a weekly paper in his native country. They were able to convince him to immigrate to Russia and begin working on establishing a newspaper.

Sauer worked with his business partner Annemarie van Gaal to introduce Cosmopolitan and Playboy to Russia, among other magazines through their publishing house 'Independent Media,' which was founded in 1992. Sauer founded The Moscow Times, the first English language paper in Russia, as part of the new publishing house alongside the Vedomosti. Over the years, he became a successful media entrepreneur in Russia.

In 2005 Sauer sold The Moscow Times to the Finnish Sanoma.

in 2010 Sauer became one of the new owners of NRC Handelsblad, company which purchased his previous holding Het Gesprek.

In 2017 Sauer repurchased The Moscow Times. He claimed that the paper could serve as a great medium for educating people abroad about underreported domestic subjects.

References 

Living people
Businesspeople from Amsterdam
Maoists
Dutch newspaper publishers (people)
The Moscow Times
Year of birth missing (living people)